Kim Clijsters was the defending champion, but lost in the second round to Julia Vakulenko in her last professional match for over two years.
 Justine Henin won in the final against Alona Bondarenko 6-1, 6-3

Seeds

Draw

Finals

Top half

Bottom half

External links
Draw and Qualifying Draw

Warsaw Open
JandS Cup